Tina Barišić (born 30 October 2000) is a Croatian handballer for RK Podravka Koprivnica and the Croatian national team.

She represented Croatia at the 2022 European Women's Handball Championship.

References

2000 births
Living people
Croatian female handball players
Sportspeople from Split, Croatia
Competitors at the 2022 Mediterranean Games
Mediterranean Games silver medalists for Croatia
Mediterranean Games medalists in handball
RK Podravka Koprivnica players
21st-century Croatian women